Perry Traditional Academy, also known as Perry High School, is a high school in the Perry North neighborhood of Pittsburgh, Pennsylvania. Perry is one of ten secondary schools in the Pittsburgh Public Schools. Opened during the 1922-1923 school year, Perry has provided quality education to the youth of the Northside of Pittsburgh and the City of Pittsburgh for a century.

Feeder district
Perry Traditional Academy serves all of the following neighborhoods, which constitute the Northside of Pittsburgh:  Allegheny Center, Allegheny West, Brighton Heights, California-Kirkbride, Central Northside, Chateau, East Allegheny, Fineview, Manchester, Marshall-Shadeland (Brightwood), North Shore (Lower Northside), Northview Heights, Perry Hilltop, Perry North (Observatory Hill), Perry South, Spring Hill-City View, Spring Garden, Summer Hill and Troy Hill.

Enrollment

As of October 1, 2021:

Mascot
The school's mascot is the Commodore, named after Commodore Oliver Hazard Perry.  A mural depicting The Commodore faces the school on the old Rich Bedding Building.  It was commissioned by business owner Bill Schmidt, painted by The MLK Project and designed by Perry Alumni Bill Gandy (85) and Kimberley Robinson-Gandy (86).

Academics
Perry consists of grades 9-12.  The school comprises three schools (programs):  STEAM, CTE, and Military Science/JROTC.

Standardized tests
, Perry students performed below the state average in statewide tests.

Alma mater
Our Perry High Dear Alma Mater Thou 
Keep Watchful Eye Atop The Summit's Brow 
Thou Shalt To Us A Firm Foundation Be 
Guide, Counsel'r, Friend Throughout Eternity 
And As The Years Go Swiftly Gliding By 
Still Thou Shalt to Be Our Own Dear Perry High 
Chorus: 
All Hail To Perry, We'll Honor And Praise Thee' 
To Alma Mater We'll Ever Be True 
All Hail To Perry, We'll Honor And Praise Thee' 
We'll Love Forever The White And Blue

Notable alumni
 Glenn Beckert (class of 1958), Major League Baseball player for Chicago Cubs and San Diego Padres.
 Eddie Benton (class of 1992), basketball player and coach.
 Ron Carter (class of 1975), basketball player.
 Audie L. Chapman (class of 2000), Robotics Engineer Pittsburgh's first design NASA Moon Lunar Lander (2020).
 Richard Foster, modernist architect.
 Boo Jackson (class of 2000), basketball player.
 Rod Rutherford, quarterback for the NCAA's Pitt Panthers and the NFL's Carolina Panthers and Pittsburgh Steelers

References

External links
Perry Traditional Academy
Pittsburgh Public Schools

School buildings on the National Register of Historic Places in Pennsylvania
High schools in Pittsburgh
Magnet schools in Pennsylvania
School buildings completed in 1899
City of Pittsburgh historic designations
Pittsburgh History & Landmarks Foundation Historic Landmarks
National Register of Historic Places in Pittsburgh
1899 establishments in Pennsylvania